Glenn Woodward Davis (December 26, 1924 – March 9, 2005) was a professional American football player for the Los Angeles Rams. He is best known for his college football career for the United States Military Academy at West Point from 1943 to 1946, where he was known as "Mr. Outside." He was named a consensus All-American three times, and in 1946 won the Heisman Trophy and was named Sporting News Player of the Year and Associated Press Athlete of the Year.

Early life
Davis was born and raised in Southern California, the son of a bank manager. Glenn and his twin brother Ralph played high school football at Bonita High School in La Verne, California. In 1942, Davis led the Bearcats to an 11–0 record and the school's first-ever football championship, earning the Southern Section Player of the Year award. In 1987, Bonita High's stadium was dedicated in his name. The brothers were close and had originally planned to attend USC in Los Angeles, but when their U.S. Representative agreed to sponsor them with appointments to West Point, they decided to go there.

College football career

At West Point, under coach Earl Blaik, Davis played fullback in his freshman season. Blaik moved him to halfback for his three varsity seasons, while Doc Blanchard took over at fullback. With Davis and Blanchard, Army went 27–0–1 in 1944, 1945, and 1946. Davis was nicknamed "Mr. Outside", while Blanchard was "Mr. Inside".

Davis averaged 8.3 yards per carry over his career and 11.5 yards per carry in 1945; both results are records which still stand today. Davis led the nation in 1944 with 120 points. He scored 59 touchdowns, including eight on his freshman squad, in his career. His single-season mark of 20 touchdowns stood as a record for 10 years.

Blanchard and he set a then-record 97 career touchdowns by two teammates. (The record was broken by USC backs Reggie Bush and LenDale White, who had 99 career touchdowns.) In 2007, Davis was ranked #13 on ESPN's list of Top 25 Players in College Football History.

For all three varsity years at West Point, Davis was a "consensus" All-America player (that is, selected by all the different groups picking All-America teams). In 1944, he won the Maxwell Award and the Walter Camp Trophy, and was runner-up for the Heisman Trophy. In 1945, he was again runner-up for the Heisman (won by his teammate Blanchard). In 1946, he won the Heisman and was named the Associated Press Male Athlete of the Year. In 1961, Davis was inducted into the College Football Hall of Fame.

Davis also starred in baseball, basketball, and track at West Point.

After West Point
Davis graduated from West Point in June 1947 and entered the U.S. Army as a second lieutenant. He was offered a contract and $75,000 signing bonus by the Brooklyn Dodgers, but declined, as he was required to serve in the Army and would be a relatively old rookie after that.

In spite of Davis' service obligation, the Detroit Lions of the National Football League selected Davis with the second overall pick of the 1947 NFL Draft, held in December 1946. In September 1947, the Los Angeles Rams acquired the rights to Davis from the Lions. He applied to resign his commission in December, but  was refused by the Secretary of the Army Kenneth Royall.

Davis was also denied extended furloughs or other accommodations that might allow him to play football while serving in the Army. There was public feeling that after the expense of his West Point education, he should not just go off to play football.

Davis (and Blanchard) did earn $25,000 each by appearing in the low-budget movie The Spirit of West Point (about their football careers). Davis tore a ligament in his right knee during filming.

Davis served three years in the Army. While on leave in 1948, he attended the Rams training camp and played in a preseason game. He then reported for duty in Korea (this was before the Korean War, which began after he returned to the U.S.).

Professional football career
Davis' service obligation ended in 1950, and he finally joined the Rams for  their 1950 season.

Despite his knee injury, Davis was an effective player, and was even named to the 1950 Pro Bowl on the strength of his 42 catches for 592 yards as a receiver and 416 yards on 88 carries as a runner; he had seven total touchdowns. He scored the first touchdown of the 1950 NFL Championship Game on a 82-yard touchdown catch from Bob Waterfield; the Rams narrowly lost 30-28. In 1951, he injured his knee again, and he ran for a total of only 290 yards from scrimmage. He caught three passes for ten yards while running the ball six times for -6 yards in the 1951 NFL Championship Game, which Los Angeles won 24-17.

He did not play the team in the 1952 season. In September 1953, the Rams released him, ending his professional career.

Post-football life
Davis moved to Texas to work in the oil industry, but returned to California a few years later.  He became special events director for the Los Angeles Times, organizing and directing the newspaper's charity fundraising events. He held this job until his retirement in 1987. The Times gives the annual Glenn Davis Award in his honor (not to be confused with the Glenn Davis Army Award).

Personal life
Davis was married three times. In 1948, he dated actress Elizabeth Taylor. From 1951 to 1952 he was briefly married to film actress Terry Moore.

In 1953, Davis married Ellen Slack; they were married for 42 years, until her death in 1995. They had one son, Ralph.

In 1996, Davis married Yvonne Ameche, widow of NFL star and fellow Heisman Trophy Winner Alan Ameche. Davis was survived by his wife Yvonne, his son, Ralph, and a stepson, John Slack III.

Death
Davis died of prostate cancer at La Quinta, California, at age 80 on March 9, 2005. He is interred in West Point Cemetery.

See also
 List of NCAA major college football yearly scoring leaders

References

External links
 
 
 
 

1924 births
2005 deaths
American football halfbacks
American men's basketball players
Army Black Knights baseball players
Army Black Knights football players
Army Black Knights men's basketball players
Army Black Knights men's track and field athletes
Los Angeles Rams players
All-American college football players
College Football Hall of Fame inductees
Heisman Trophy winners
Maxwell Award winners
Western Conference Pro Bowl players
United States Army officers
Sportspeople from Burbank, California
People from Claremont, California
People from La Verne, California
Players of American football from California
Baseball players from California
Basketball players from California
Track and field athletes from California
American twins
Twin sportspeople
Deaths from cancer in California
Deaths from prostate cancer
Burials at West Point Cemetery
Military personnel from California